The Packer family has played a significant role in the Australian media, political and social sphere since the beginning of the twentieth century.

The family has had numerous interests in Australian business, most notably in media, property and recently in gambling.

Family tree

Robert Clyde Packer (24 July 1879 – 12 April 1934) m. Ethel Maude née Hewson (16 January 1878 − 1 April 1947)
Sir (Douglas) Frank Hewson Packer  (3 December 1906 – 1 May 1974) m. (1) Gretel Joyce Bullmore (5 May 1907 − 16 August 1960); (2) Florence Mathilde Adeline Violet (Vincent), née Porges (June 1915 − 22 December 2012)
Kerry Francis Bullmore Packer  (17 December 1937 – 26 December 2005) m. Roslyn Redman née Weedon  in 1963
Gretel Packer ( – ) m. (1) Nick Barham (m. ?? – 1999); (2) Shane Murray (m. ?? – 2007)
Francesca Barham ( – )
Ben Barham ( – )
William Kerry Murray ( – )
James Douglas Packer (8 September 1967 – ) m. (1) Jodhi Meares (m. 1999 – 2002); (2) Erica née Baxter (m. 2007 – 2013)
Indigo Packer (Baxter) (27 July 2008 – ) 
Jackson Lloyd Packer (Baxter) (1 February 2010 – ) 
Emmanuelle Sheelah Packer (Baxter) (22 September 2012 – )
(Robert) Clyde Packer (22 July 1935 – 8 April 2001) m. (1) Angela née Money in 1961, divorced in 1972; (2) Kate Clifford in 1977.
Francis Clyde Packer
Kathleen Mary Packer (1910 – 2000), known later as Lady Stening, m. Sir George Stening (1904 – 1996)

Notable members

References

 
Australian families
Packer